Elaldı can refer to:

 Elaldı, Tercan
 Elaldı, Vezirköprü